Harmon Elwood Kirby (January 27, 1934 – May 21, 2014) was an American diplomat, U.S. Ambassador to Togo, and Foreign Service Officer. He was appointed to that position on October 22, 1990, and left his post on July 16, 1994.

Kirby received his Bachelor of Arts (BA) degree from Harvard University and his Master of Arts (MA) degree from George Washington University. Harmon was enrolled in the U.S. Army from 1956 to 1958.

Kirby served many positions such as the Director of United Nations Political Affairs at the U.S. Department of State. He was a Foreign Service officer in Geneva, Madras, New Delhi, Brussels, Khartoum, Rabat, and Washington, D.C., as of 1961. In addition, Mr. Kirby served as an executive assistant to the executive vice president of Hudson Pulp and Paper Corp. in New York City from 1960 to 1961, and in personnel and labor relations for the Diamond National Corp. in Middletown, Ohio, from 1959 to 1960.

He was married, had two children, and resided in Bethesda, Maryland.

References

1934 births
Ambassadors of the United States to Togo
Harvard University alumni
George Washington University alumni
2014 deaths
United States Foreign Service personnel